Charlotte is a city in Atascosa County, Texas, United States. The population was 1,715 at the 2010 census. It is part of the San Antonio Metropolitan Statistical Area. The town is named for Charlotte Simmons, the daughter of Dr. Charles Simmons, who aided in the development of Atascosa County.

Geography

Charlotte is located at  (28.860624, –98.707571).

Demographics

2020 census

As of the 2020 United States census, there were 1,524 people, 499 households, and 333 families residing in the city.

2000 census
As of the census of 2000, there were 1,637 people, 514 households, and 401 families residing in the city. The population density was 823.4 people per square mile (317.6/km2). There were 585 housing units at an average density of 294.3 per square mile (113.5/km2). The racial makeup of the city was 64.94% White, 0.06% African American, 1.65% Native American, 29.93% from other races, and 3.42% from two or more races. Hispanic or Latino of any race were 81.19% of the population.

There were 514 households, out of which 45.1% had children under the age of 18 living with them, 54.3% were married couples living together, 17.1% had a female householder with no husband present, and 21.8% were non-families. 18.7% of all households were made up of individuals, and 10.5% had someone living alone who was 65 years of age or older. The average household size was 3.18 and the average family size was 3.61.

In the city, the population was spread out, with 34.8% under the age of 18, 10.2% from 18 to 24, 27.4% from 25 to 44, 18.0% from 45 to 64, and 9.7% who were 65 years of age or older. The median age was 30 years. For every 100 females, there were 98.9 males. For every 100 females age 18 and over, there were 92.1 males.

The median income for a household in the city was $24,792, and the median income for a family was $27,976. Males had a median income of $24,375 versus $15,313 for females. The per capita income for the city was $9,769. About 24.9% of families and 30.0% of the population were below the poverty line, including 35.1% of those under age 18 and 25.0% of those age 65 or over.

Education
Charlotte is served by the Charlotte Independent School District and home to the Charlotte High School Trojans.  According to Guadalupe San Miguel, In Charlotte ISD is where the first official legal complaint regarding racial segregation against Mexicans in Texas took place in 1928.  The complaint was filed by Felipe Vela on behalf of his daughter, Amada Vela.  Their racial segregation complaint reached the State Board of Education and they sided with the Vela family.

Climate
The climate in this area is characterized by hot, humid summers and generally mild to cool winters.  According to the Köppen Climate Classification system, Charlotte has a humid subtropical climate, abbreviated "Cfa" on climate maps.

Gallery

References

External links
 Handbook of Texas article

Cities in Atascosa County, Texas
Cities in Texas
Greater San Antonio